Ulysses Freeman Doubleday (December 15, 1792 – March 11, 1866) was an American politician who served two terms as a U.S. Representative from New York from 1831 to 1833, and from 1835 to 1837.

He was also a newspaper publisher, a book publisher, printer,  a veteran of the War of 1812, a merchant, and farmer.

Biography
Born in Otsego County, New York, Doubleday received a limited formal schooling. While living in Cooperstown he was apprenticed to the village printer at a very young age. Apprentices were legally bound to work for many years with little or no rights but with a chance to learn a useful trade. 

Ulysses was near the last of 27 Doubleday children. His father Abner Doubleday was a farmer and Revolutionary War soldier. His mother Mercy Freeman was a preacher's daughter.
He learned the art of printing and worked as a printer in Cooperstown, Utica, and Albany, New York.
He served at Sackets Harbor in the War of 1812.
He established the Saratoga Courier at Ballston Spa.

Publisher 
He was a book publisher under the name UF Doubleday printing leather bound books starting in 1817. He published the following books. Samuel Young's Treatise on Internal Navigation, 1817 (with parts written by Albert Galatin), Gilbert McMaster's An Apology for the Book of Psalms, 1818 and William Ray's Poems on Various Subjects, 1821.  A Brief Account of the Construction, Management, & Discipline &c. &c. of the New-York State Prison at Auburn, together with a Compendium of Criminal Law by Powers, Gershom. 1826 Auburn. Other books printed by Doubleday are Almanacs from 1820 to 1827,  school books on Geography and Reading, pamphlets religious and civic organizations. 

He moved to Auburn, New York, where he published and edited the newspaper Cayuga Patriot 1819–1839. He ran a stationery store in Auburn called Doubleday's. 

The town of Auburn benefited from the Erie Canal and became the 3rd largest city in New York State.

Congress 
Doubleday was elected as a Jacksonian to the Twenty-second Congress (March 4, 1831 – March 3, 1833). 

He was appointed inspector and warden of Auburn Prison in 1834. As warden he abolished cold water punishment of prisoners. 
In May 1834 he helped charter the Auburn and Syracuse Railroad.

Doubleday was elected to the Twenty-fourth Congress (March 4, 1835 – March 3, 1837).

Later career 
He engaged in agricultural pursuits in Scipio, New York from 1837 to 1846.
He moved to New York City and engaged in mercantile pursuits 1846–1860.

Death and burial 
He died on March 11, 1866, in Bloomington, Illinois.
He was interred in the Bloomington Township Old City Cemetery, Bloomington, Illinois. He currently rests at Evergreen Cemetery in Bloomington, Illinois.

Family 
He married Hester Donnelly and they were parents of Thomas D. Doubleday, Major General Abner Doubleday, Brevet Brigadier General Ulysses Doubleday and Jane Ann Doubleday (March 5, 1830 – June 12, 1843).

References

External links
Ulysses Freeman Doubleday - McLean County Museum of History

1792 births
1866 deaths
People from Otsego County, New York
American printers
Book
United States Army personnel of the War of 1812
Jacksonian members of the United States House of Representatives from New York (state)
19th-century American politicians
People from Scipio, New York
Members of the United States House of Representatives from New York (state)